The District Council of Narridy was a local government area in South Australia, centred on the town of Narridy and the surrounding cadastral hundred of the same name. It was proclaimed on 2 March 1876 with responsibility for the Hundred of Narridy, and divided into five wards (North-West, North-East, Centre, South-West and South-East), each electing one councillor. A council chamber had been completed by the end of December 1879; it was described as "not a large building" but "well suited for the purposes for which it was intended". The Narridy council ceased to exist from 5 January 1888 after being amalgamated with the adjacent District Council of Georgetown by the District Councils Act 1887. Its abolition was followed by angry local calls for a demerger later in 1888, which met with blanket government refusal; at a local meeting discussing this outcome, it was reported that "it was freely expressed that the Premier was working into the hands of Georgetown".

Chairmen of the District Council of Narridy

 J. Porter (1877-1879) 
 W. Brock (1879-1881) 
 J. Porter (1881-1883)

References

Narridy
Narridy